Alexandre Manuel Penetra Correia, known as Alexandre Penetra (born 9 September 2001) is a Portuguese football player. He plays for Famalicão.

Club career
In August 2020, he signed a three-year contract with Famalicão.

He made his Primeira Liga debut for Famalicão on 15 August 2021 in a game against Porto.

References

External links
 
 

2001 births
People from Viseu
Living people
Portuguese footballers
Portugal youth international footballers
Association football defenders
F.C. Famalicão players
Primeira Liga players
Sportspeople from Viseu District